Mikshino is a rural locality (a village) in Vakhromeyevskoye Rural Settlement, Kameshkovsky District, Vladimir Oblast, Russia. The population was 47 as of 2010.

Geography 
Mikshino is located 20 km north of Kameshkovo (the district's administrative centre) by road. Ivishenye is the nearest rural locality.

References 

Rural localities in Kameshkovsky District